Cerro de Gorría is a 1.708 metres high mountain in Spain.

Geography 
The mountain is located in Ávila Province, in the southern part of the autonomous community of Castile and León. It's the highest peak of the Sierra de Ávila, and is visible from a large part of the province.

Access to the summit 
The summit can be accessed in one hour's walk from Pasarilla del Rebollar (1300 m, Valdecasa municipality). Its summit offers an interesting view on la Moraña, Amblés valley, Sierra Paramera, and la Serrota. In a clean day also Sierra de Guadarrama can be seen in the distance.

See also
Sistema Central

References

External links
   Route to Cerro de Gorría from Balbarda

Sistema Central
Gorria
Geography of the Province of Ávila
Gorria